Irreligion in Morocco is relatively uncommon, in the country. While a 2015 poll of about 1000 Moroccans by Gallup International found that 4% of respondents said they were "not religious", and 1% reported being a "convinced atheist", while 93% said they were religious; Another survey of about 2,400 Moroccans in 2019 by Arab Barometer found that 13% answered that they are "not religious", 44% said they are "somewhat religious", and 38% "religious". Younger people were less likely to consider themselves "religious", with only 24% of those aged 18–29 years identifying themselves as such.

The situation of Moroccan nonbelievers
Moroccan non-believers can express their opinion publicly without the fear of any real consequences, although article 220 of the Moroccan criminal code condemns “those who attempt to shake the faith of a Muslim” to up to 3 years in jail. However, there aren't many examples of this law being used for atheists in Morocco.
Kacem El Ghazzali is one of the publicly known Moroccan atheists. His writings stress the importance of freedom of thought which lacks in Islamic countries.

Council of Ex-Muslims of Morocco

In 2013, the Council of Ex-Muslims in Morocco was founded by Imad Iddine Habib. It was the first public atheist and non-religious organisation in a country with Islam as its state religion. The goals of the council are:

 Universal rights and equal citizenship for all. We are opposed to cultural relativism and the tolerance of inhuman beliefs, discrimination and abuse in the name of respecting religion or culture.
 Freedom to criticize religion. Prohibition of restrictions on unconditional freedom of criticism and expression using so-called religious ‘sanctities’.
 Freedom of and from religion.
 Separation of religion from the state and legal and educational system.
 Prohibition of religious customs, rules, ceremonies or activities that are incompatible with or infringe people’s rights and freedoms.
 Abolition of all restrictive and repressive cultural and religious customs which hinder and contradict woman’s independence, free will and equality. Prohibition of segregation of sexes.
 Prohibition of interference by any authority, family members or relatives, or official authorities in the private lives of women and men and their personal, emotional and sexual relationships and sexuality.
 Protection of children from manipulation and abuse by religion and religious institutions.
 Prohibition of any kind of financial, material or moral support by the state or state institutions to religion and religious activities and institutions.
 Prohibition of all forms of religious intimidation and threats.

Notable irreligious Moroccans

In Morocco
Zineb El Rhazoui, co-founder of the Mali movement, and human rights activist. 
Kacem El Ghazzali, a secularist writer, and human rights activist. He is one of the few Moroccans to publicly announce his atheism. 
Ibtissam Lachgar, a feminist and LGBT advocate. Co-founder of the Mali Movement.
Fedwa Misk, a Moroccan activist.

Diaspora
Hassan Bahara, a Moroccan-Dutch writer.
Hafid Bouazza, a Moroccan-Dutch writer.
Najat El Hachmi, a Moroccan writer.

See also
 Religion in Morocco
 Christianity in Morocco
 Islam in Morocco
 Demographics of Morocco

References

Religion in Morocco
Morocco
Morocco
Morocco